Petr Hruška (born 7 June 1964) is a Czech poet, screenwriter, literary critic and academic.

Life
Hruška was born in Ostrava, a city known for coal-mining and steel production, and many of his poems reflect the industrial, working-class nature of the city, whose traditional industries have gone pear-shaped. He got his engineering degree (Ing.) at VŠB-Technical University of Ostrava (he specialised in water purification, 1987), MA at the Faculty of Arts of University of Ostrava (1990–94, thesis "Contemporary Czech subculture prose and poetry") and Ph.D. at the Faculty of Arts of Masaryk University in Brno ("Postwar surrealism and the reaction to the momentum of the avant-garde model in the official poetry", 2003). He works at the Department of Czech Literature at Czech Academy of Sciences in Brno where he focuses on Czech post-1945 poetry. He co-authored the four-volume History of Czech literature 1945 – 1989 (Dějiny české literatury 1945 – 1989), the second volume of the Dictionary of Czech writers since 1945 (Slovníku českých spisovatelů od roku 1945), and Dictionary of Czech Literary Magazines, Periodical Anthologies and Almanacs 1945 – 2000 ( 1945–2000).

He also worked as a university lecturer of Czech literature at Masaryk University and the University of Ostrava. He was a member of the body of editors of the magazine Host and an editor of the magazine Obrácená strana měsíce. Between 1995 – 1998 he participated in publishing the magazine Landek (with Jan Balabán and others). He co-organises literary evenings, festivals and exhibitions in Ostrava (e. g. – with Ivan Motýl – Literární harendy, 1992 – 1994 which were partly improvised literature, text-appeal and happening evenings); he also acts in the cabaret of Jiří Surůvka.

His twin brother Pavel is a literary critic. Petr Hruška lives with his partner Yvetta Ellerová (a singer and composer in the groups Norská trojka, and Complotto) and their three children in Ostrava.

Works 

Petr Hruška says: "Poetry is not a decoration of life". According to him, poetry must "excite, disturb, amaze, surprise, unsettle the reader, demolish the existing aesthetic satisfactions and create new ones." Described as a poet of unrest and hidden dangers in everyday life, he confronts readers with a world seemingly familiar, and yet surprising in its reality. Casual situations are the source of a subtle tension and deep, though at first glance hardly noticeable meaning. He said in an interview: "I think that real grace and gracefulness appear only where all the gloominess, depression, and weariness of life, all the 'loneliness of the relationship' are somehow present as well. Only in the midst of that can a thin thread of light shine, a thin thread, which however contains all the fateful nearness that two people are capable of."

About Hruška's work, poet Ivan Wernisch wrote: "You manage to write poetry without unavailing things, that is, without lyrical babbling." He is one of the most praised Czech poets of the post-1989 era.

He publishes poetry in many magazines (Host, Tvar, Revolver Revue, Literární noviny, Souvislosti, Weles etc.), writes reviews for Tvar and the Czech Radio Vltava, and writes academic articles (for Host, Tvar, Slovenská literatúra, Protimluv, Obrácená strana měsíce etc.) His poems have been translated into English, French, German, Slovenian, Italian, Dutch, Polish and Croatian. In 1998 he was awarded the Dresdner Lyrikpreis and in 2009 the Jan Skácel Award. His poetry collection Darmata won the Czech State Award for Literature in 2013. In Italy he won the Premio Piero Ciampi 2014. He was the editor of the Collected Works of Jan Balabán and Selected Poems by Ivan Martin Jirous; he also compiled an anthology of 20th-century Czech poetry for a Slovenian edition.

Poetry books 
 Obývací nepokoje (Unrest Rooms) Sfinga, Ostrava 1995, il. by Adam Plaček
 Měsíce (Months) Host, Brno 1998, il. by Zdeněk Janošec-Benda
 Vždycky se ty dveře zavíraly (The Door Had Always Been Closing) Host, Brno 2002, il. by Daniel Balabán
 Zelený svetr (The Green Sweater) Host, Brno 2004, an omnibus of the three previous books, plus a collection of prose Odstavce (Paragraphs), il. by Hana Puchová, afterword Jiří Trávníček
 Auta vjíždějí do lodí (Cars Drive Into Ships) Host, Brno 2007, il. by Jakub Špaňhel
 Darmata (Host, Brno 2012) – il. by Katarína Szanyi
 Jedna věta (prose; Revolver Revue, 2015)
 Nevlastní (Argo, 2017) – il. by Zdeněk Janošec Benda
 Nikde není řečeno (Host, 2019) – il. by Jakub Špaňhel

Prose
 Jedna věta (Revolver Revue, 2015)
V závalu (sloupky, podpovídky, odstavce a jiné krátké texty) (Revolver Revue, 2020)

Poetry books abroad 
 Meseci in druge pesmi (Društvo Apokalipsa, Ljubljana 2004), tr. by Anka Polajnar and Stanislava Chrobáková-Repar, Slovenia
 Jarek anrufen (Edition Toni Pongratz, Hauzenberg 2008), tr. by Reiner Kunze, Germany
 Mieszkalne niepokoje (Instytut Mikolowski, Mikolow 2011), tr. by Franciszek Nastulczyk
 Le macchie entrano nelle navi (Valigie Rosse, Livorno 2014), tr. by Jiří Špička and Paolo Maccari
 Mondom neked (Jelenkor, Budapest 2016), tr. by István Vörös
 Il soggiorno breve delle parole (qudulibri – edizione maggio, Bologna 2017), tr. by Jana Sovová and Elisa Bin
 Darmaty (Instytut Mikołowski, Mikołów 2017), tr. Franciszek Nastulczyk
 Dan velik kao oboreni jelen (Artikulacije, Koprivnica 2018), tr. Matija Ivačić
 Nužni smještaj (Adin Ljuca Samizdat, Praha 2018), tr. by Adin Ljuca
 Irgendwohin nach Haus (Edizion Azur, Leipzig 2019), tr. by Marina Lisa and Kerstin Becker
 Szmaty i drut (Instytut Mikołowski, Mikołów 2020), tr. by Franciszek Nastulczyk
 Volevamo salvarci (Miraggi edizioni, Turin, Itálie 2021) tr. by Elisa Bin

Work in anthologies (selection) 

Czech:

 Almanach Welesu (Weles, Brno 1997, ed. Vojtěch Kučera)
 V srdci Černého pavouka – ostravská literární a umělecká scéna 90. let (Votobia, Olomouc 2000), ed. Milan Kozelka
 Cestou – básnický almanach Welesu (Weles, Brno 2003), ed. Miroslav Chocholatý, Vojtěch Kučera, Pavel Sobek
 Co si myslí andělíček – dítě v české poezii (Brno 2004), ed. Ivan Petlan and Tomáš Lotocki
 Antologie nové české literatury 1995-2004 (Fra, Praha 2004), ed. Radim Kopáč and Karolina Jirkalová, afterword by Jan Suk
 S tebou sám – antologie současné české milostné poezie (Dauphin, Praha 2005), ed. Ondřej Horák
 7edm: Petr Hruška, Jan Balabán, Petr Motýl, Pavel Šmíd, Sabina Karasová, Radek Fridrich, Patrik Linhart (Theo, Pardubice 2005)
 Báseň mého srdce (Literula, Praha 2006), ed. Vladimír Křivánek
 Antologie české poezie II. díl (1986–2006), 2007
 Nejlepší české básně 2009 (Host, Brno 2009), eds. Karel Šiktanc and Karel Piorecký
 Nejlepší české básně 2010 (Host, Brno 2010), eds. Miloslav Topinka and Jakub Řehák
 Nejlepší české básně 2011 (Host, Brno 2011), eds. Petr Král and Jan Štolba
 Nejlepší české básně 2012 (Host, Brno 2012), ed. Simona Martínková-Racková
 Nejlepší české básně 2013 (Host, Brno 2013), eds. Ivan Wernisch and Wanda Heinrichová
 Co zůstává – malá antologie soudobé české poezie (Centrum pro studium demokracie a kultury, Brno 2013), ed. František Mikš
 Nejlepší české básně 2016 (Host, Brno 2016), eds. Vít Slíva and Jakub Chrobák
 Nejlepší české básně 2017 (Host, Brno 2017), eds. Sylva Fischerová and Jan Šulc
 Nejlepší české básně 2018 (Host, Brno 2018), eds. J. H. Krchovský and Ondřej Hanus

Foreign:

 La poésie tchèque en fin de siècle (Sources, Namur, Belgium 1999, ed. Petr Král), tr. by Petr Král
 Antologie de la poésie tchèque contemporaine 1945-2000 (Gallimard, Paris, France 2002, ed. Petr Král), tr. Petr Král
 Reiner Kunze: Wo wir zu Hause das Salz haben – Nachdichtungen (S. Fischer Verlag, Frankfurt am Mein 2003), tr. by Reiner Kunze
 Literair Paspoort 2004 (Den Haag, Netherlands 2004), tr. by Jana Beranová
 In our own words (MW Enterprises, Cary, USA 2005, ed. Marlow Weaver), tr. by Zuzana Gabrišová
 Из века в век (Iz vieka v viek) – češskaja poezija (Pranat, Moscow, Russia 2005, ed. Dalibor Dobiáš), tr. by Olga Lukavaja
 Tra ansia e finitudine – Szorongás és végesség között (Budapest, Maďarsko 2005) tr. by István Vörös and Claudio Poeta
 Circumference – poetry in translation (New York, USA 2006, ed. Stefania Heim, Jennifer Kronovet), tr. by Jonathan Bolton
 New European Poets (Graywolf Press, Saint Paul, Minnesota, USA 2008, ed. Wayne Miller and Kevin Prufer), tr. by Zuzana Gabrišová
 [avant-poste] numero special (Praha-Paříž 2017), tr. Petr Král
 Prchavé domovy-Fleeting Homes (eds. Robert Hýsek and Matthew Sweney, Universita Palackého, Olomouc 2010), tr. Matthew Sweney
 Întunericul din Camera Copilion – Antologie de poezie cehă contemporană (ed. Mircea Dan Duţă, Descrierea CIP and Bibliotecii Nationale a României, Bucuresti 2015), tr. by Mircea Dan Duţă
 Przewodnik po zaminowanym terenie (ed. Krzysztof Śliwka, Marek Śnieciński, Ośrodek Postaw Twórczych, Wrocław 2016), tr. by Franciszek Nastulczyk
 Die letzte Metro – junge Literatur aus Tschechien (Verlag Voland & Quist, Dresden, Leipzig 2017), tr. by Martina Lisa
 Pesem sem – razumljive pesmi za nerazumljive čase (eds. Igor Saksida, Aleš Šteger, Beletrina, Ljubljana 2018), tr. by Anka Polajnar, Stanislava Chrobáková-Repar

Academic monographs 
 Někde tady. Český básník Karel Šiktanc (Host, Brno 2010)
 Daleko do ničeho. Básník Ivan Wernisch (Host, Brno 2019)

Academic articles (selection) 

 Do hospody v literatuře (Tvar 1996, no. 11)
 Setrvačnost avantgardního modelu – nový surrealismus. (Host 1998, no. 9)
 Básně psané na střed (Host 1999, no. 1)
 Pořád na svém místě. Karlu Šiktancovi začaly vycházet sebrané spisy (Host 2000, no. 8)
 Povinnost jistot a potřeba pochyb (Host 2000, no. 10)
 Druhá vlna první velikosti (Host 2002, no. 10)
 První knížky veršů v mladofrontovní edici Ladění (Slovenská literatura 2002, no. 5)
 Ouřezek, potutel, sakr, ošoust… Karel Šiktanc a umění klnout, Host 2009, no. 9, p. 15–19
 Dekáda nespokojenosti. Úsilí poezie v prvním desetiletí nového milénia, Host 2014, no. 9, p. 23—28
 Nic vážného se neděje! Ivan Wernisch a zapomenuté kouzlo ruského lubku, Host 2016, no. 8, p. 61—69
 Působení (a řádění) Ivana Wernische v Literárních novinách devadesátých let, Souvislosti 2017, no. 3, p. 16-33
 Projev nad hrobem Petra Bezruče 15. září 2017 in Petr Bezruč. Bard prvý, co promluvil. Sborník z konference, konané 21.-22. září 2017 u příležitosti stého padesátého výročí narození Vladimíra Vaška. Ostravská univerzita, Filozofická fakulta, Ostrava 2018, p. 9-10.
 Chlap ve stoje (Karel Šiktanc devadesátiletý), Host 2018, no. 7, p. 31—35

Theatre and television 

 Screenplay (together with Radovan Lipus) of a play Průběžná O(s)trava krve, first staged 1994, on TV 1997
 Screenplay to the documentary film Genius loci - Historie časopisu Host, Host do domu (dir. by Vladimír Kelbl, TV Brno, 2002, broadcast 2003)

CD 

 Zelený Petr (Norská trojka, CD, 2002), lyrics
 Obývací nepokoje (Selected poems on CD), in magazine Aluze 2/3, 2004)
 Průběžná O(s)trava krve, stage play adapted for radio (2000)

References

External links

 Poems in English
 Obrácená strana měsíce, in Czech
 CV at AV ČR, in Czech
 Host Brno, in Czech 
 Interview, in Czech

20th-century Czech poets
Czech male poets
1964 births
Living people
Writers from Ostrava
Masaryk University alumni
21st-century Czech poets
20th-century male writers
21st-century male writers